Bacchantes Embracing is a sculpture by Auguste Rodin. Despite its title it shows a bacchante embracing a female faun. It was probably originally conceived before 1896.

Casts
A bronze cast made after 1967 is in the Brooklyn Museum.

See also
List of sculptures by Auguste Rodin

References

External links

Sculptures by Auguste Rodin
Collection of the Brooklyn Museum